South Stream is a meltwater stream 2 nautical miles (3.7 km) southwest of Marble Point on the coast of Victoria Land. It issues from the front of Wilson Piedmont Glacier and flows southeastward to Bernacchi Bay. The stream was studied by Robert L. Nichols, geologist for Metcalf and Eddy, Engineers, Boston, MA, which made engineering studies here under contract to the U.S. Navy in the 1957–58 season. So named by Nichols because the stream was located south of the U.S. Navy installations in the Marble Point area.

Rivers of Victoria Land
Scott Coast